Bishop O'Connell may refer to:

Catholic bishops in the United States
Anthony O'Connell (1938–2012), a confessed child molester who served as a cleric, and the first Bishop of Knoxville, Tennessee
Bishop Denis J. O'Connell (1849–1927), bishop of the diocese of Richmond, Virginia
David M. O'Connell (born 1955), bishop of the Diocese of Trenton
David G. O'Connell (1953–2023),  auxiliary bishop of the Archdiocese of Los Angeles

Other meanings
Bishop O'Connell High School, parochial secondary school in Arlington, Virginia